Ampeloniakos F.C. is a Greek football club, based in Ampelonas, Larissa.

The club was founded in 1953. They will play in Football League 2 for the season 2013-14.

Honors 
Larissa FCA Championship:
Winners (2): 2010-11, 2014-15
 Runners-up (2): 1978-79, 1981-82
Larissa FCA Cup 
 Winners (2): 2012, 2015
 Runners-up (2): 1994, 2008
Larissa Super Cup: 2011

Notable players
 Giannis Gkampetas
 Vangelis Kousieras
 Andreas Chatziliontas

Notable coaches
 Dimitrios Kapetanopoulos

Reference section

Football clubs in Thessaly
Sport in Larissa
Association football clubs established in 1953
1953 establishments in Greece